The Dr. Wallace C. Abbott House was designated a landmark by the city of Chicago, Illinois on March 1, 2006.  The home was built in 1891 for the founder of Abbott Laboratories. In 2019, it was described as a private, "7,000-square-foot Victorian, which has five bedrooms, solar panels and a rentable coach house and is prominent on a corner lot that's the equivalent of 4.9 standard 25-by-125-foot Chicago lots."

A replica of the house exists on the Abbott Laboratories corporate campus in Green Oaks, Illinois. The replica contains some elements taken from the original, including the front door, a fireplace mantel, some stained glass, and a steppingstone, engraved with the name Wallace Abbott, for getting into and out of carriages. The replica is closed to the public.

References

Houses completed in 1891
Houses in Chicago
Chicago Landmarks
1891 establishments in Illinois